Yury Denisov (also spelt as Yuri Denisov) is a Russian wrestler born in 1988.

Major events

References 

Living people
1988 births
Russian wrestlers